This is a list of the successive governments of Romania.

Current structure and incumbents

History

Barbu Catargiu cabinet

First Nicolae Creţulescu cabinet

Mihail Kogălniceanu cabinet

Bosianu cabinet

Second Nicolae Creţulescu cabinet

First Ion Ghica cabinet

First Lascăr Cataragiu cabinet

Second Ion Ghica cabinet

Constantin A. Creţulescu cabinet

First Ştefan Golescu cabinet

Nicolae Golescu cabinet

Dimitrie Ghica cabinet

Alexandru G. Golescu cabinet

First Manolache Costache Epureanu cabinet

Third Ion Ghica cabinet

Second Lascăr Catargiu cabinet

First Ion Emanuel Florescu cabinet

Second Manolache Costache Epureanu cabinet

First Ion Brătianu cabinet

Second Ion Brătianu cabinet

Third Ion Brătianu cabinet

Dimitrie Brătianu cabinet

Fourth Ion Brătianu cabinet

First Theodor Rosetti cabinet

Second Theodor Rosetti cabinet

Third Lascăr Catargiu cabinet

Gheorghe Manu cabinet

Second Ion Emanuel Florescu cabinet

Fourth Lascăr Catargiu cabinet

First Dimitrie Sturdza cabinet

First Petre S. Aurelian cabinet

Second Dimitrie Sturdza cabinet

First Gheorghe Grigore Cantacuzino cabinet

First Petre P. Carp cabinet

Third Dimitrie Sturdza cabinet

Second Gheorghe Grigore Cantacuzino cabinet

Fourth Dimitrie Sturdza cabinet

First Ion I. C. Brătianu cabinet

Second Ion I. C. Brătianu cabinet

Second Petre P. Carp cabinet

First Titu Maiorescu cabinet

Second Titu Maiorescu cabinet

Third Ion I. C. Brătianu cabinet

Fourth Ion I. C. Brătianu cabinet

First Alexandru Averescu cabinet

Alexandru Marghiloman cabinet

Constantin Coandă cabinet

Fifth Ion I. C. Brătianu cabinet

Artutr Văitoianu cabinet

First Alexandru Vaida-Voevod cabinet

Second Alexandru Averescu cabinet

First Take ionescu cabinet

Sixth Ion I. C. Brătianu cabinet

Third Alexandru Averescu cabinet

Barbu Ştirbey cabinet

Seventh Ion I. C. Brătianu cabinet

Vintilă Brătianu cabinet

First Iuliu Maniu cabinet

First Gheorghe Mironescu cabinet

Second Iuliu Maniu cabinet

Second Gheorghe mironescu cabinet

Nicolae Iorga cabinet

Second Alexandru Vaida-Voevod cabinet

Third Alexandru Vaida-Voevod cabinet

Third Iuliu Maniu cabinet

Fourth Alexandru Vaida-Voevod cabinet

Ion Gheorghe Duca cabinet

First Gheorghe Tătărescu cabinet

Second Gheorghe Tătărescu cabinet

Third Gheorghe Tătărescu cabinet

Fourth Gheorghe Tătărescu cabinet

Octavian Goga cabinet

First Miron Cristea cabinet

Second Miron Cristea cabinet

Third Miron Cristea cabinet

Armand Călinescu cabinet

Gheorghe Argeşanu cabinet

Constantin Argetoianu cabinet

Fifth Gheorghe Tătărescu cabinet

Sixth Gheorghe Tătărescu cabinet

Ion Gigurtu cabinet

National Legionary State (First Ion Antonescu cabinet)

Second Ion Antonescu cabinet

Third Ion Antonescu cabinet

First Constantin Sănătescu cabinet

Second Constantin Sănătescu cabinet

Nicolae Rădescu cabinet

First Petru Groza cabinet

Second Petru Groza cabinet

Third Petru Groza cabinet

Fourth Petru Groza cabinet

First Gheorghe Gheorghiu-Dej cabinet

Second Gheorghe Gheorghiu-Dej cabinet

First Chivu Stoica cabinet

Second Chivu Stoica cabinet

First Ion Gheorghe Maurer cabinet

Second Ion Gheorghe Maurer cabinet

Third Ion Gheorghe Maurer cabinet

Fourth Ion Gheorghe Maurer cabinet

Fifth Ion Gheorghe Maurer cabinet

First Manea Mănescu cabinet

Second Manea Mănescu cabinet

First Ilie Verdeţ cabinet

Second Ilie Verdeţ cabinet

First Constantin Dăscălescu cabinet

Second Constantin Dăscălescu cabinet

First Petre Roman cabinet 

The first Roman Cabinet was led by Petre Roman between December 1989 – June 28, 1990.

Second Petre Roman cabinet 

The second Roman Cabinet was led by Petre Roman between June 28, 1990 – April 30, 1991.

Third Petre Roman cabinet 

The third Roman Cabinet was led by Petre Roman between April 30, 1991 – October 16, 1991.

Theodor Sotolojan cabinet 

The Stolojan I Cabinet was the Cabinet of the Government of Romania between October 16, 1991 and 1992. It was the fourth Cabinet after the fall of Communism in Romania. The Prime Minister was Theodor Stolojan, former communist official (responsible with the foreign currency), and FSN member at the time he took office.

Nicolae Văcăroiu cabinet 

The Văcăroiu I Cabinet was led by Nicolae Văcăroiu from 1992 to 1996.

Victor Ciorbea cabinet 

The Ciorbea I Cabinet was led by Victor Ciorbea from 1996 to 1998.

Radu Vasile cabinet 

The Vasile I Cabinet was led by Radu Vasile from 1998 to 1999.

Mugur Isărescu cabinet 

The Isărescu I Cabinet was led by Mugur Isărescu from 1999 to 2000.

Adrian Năstase cabinet 

The Năstase I Cabinet was led by Adrian Năstase from 2000 – 29 December 2004.

First Călin Popescu-Tăriceanu cabinet 

The first Tăriceanu Cabinet was the cabinet of the government of Romania led by Călin Popescu-Tăriceanu between December 29, 2004 and April 5, 2007. It succeeded Năstase I Cabinet, and was succeeded by the Tăriceanu II Cabinet.

It was a multiple-party coalition, formed by National Liberal Party (PNL), Democratic Party (PD), Democratic Union of Hungarians in Romania (UDMR), and Romanian Humanist Party/Conservative Party (PUR/PC). It consisted of three Ministers of State (one for each party of the coalition, except for the National Liberal Party, which held the Prime Minister position), 15 Ministers, and six Ministers Delegate. In the early 2007, the Conservative Party withdrew from the coalition. As a result, the Conservative Party's Minister Delegate post was dissolved, and the other Conservative Party's posts were re-shuffled between the National Liberal Party and the Democratic Party.

Second Călin Popescu-Tăriceanu cabinet 

The second Tăriceanu Cabinet of the Government of Romania was composed of 18 ministers, listed below. It was sworn in on April 5, 2007, and has since reshuffled numerous ministers, including in the last two months of term. It was a coalition Government, formed by the PNL, and the UDMR. Its term ended on 22 December 2008, when the new cabinet, headed by Emil Boc received the vote of confidence from the Parliament and was sworn in at Cotroceni Palace.

First Emil Boc cabinet 

The first Boc Cabinet of the Government of Romania was composed of 20 ministers, listed below. It was sworn in on 22 December 2008, the same day it received the vote of confidence from the Parliament of Romania. It was a grand coalition government, formed by the PD-L and the PSD. The Cabinet could have faced a Constitutional issue, by using the term "Deputy Prime Minister", instead of the one used in the previous cabinets "Minister of State".

Following the resignation of Liviu Dragnea (PSD) from the office of Minister of Administration and Interior, on February 2, 2009, the Parliament voted to unify the post of Deputy Prime Minister with the post of Minister of Administration and Interior.

On October 1, 2009, following the removal from office of the Deputy Prime Minister, Minister of Administration and Interior, Dan Nica (PSD), all the PSD Ministers resigned from the cabinet. As a result, all their offices were taken, ad interim by the PD-L, for a period no longer than 45 days. The cabinet should have received a new vote from the Parliament, as its political composition was changed. On 13 October 2009 the Parliament voted for a motion of no confidence. As a result, this Cabinet was just an acting Cabinet. Its term ended on 23 December 2009, when the new cabinet, headed also by Emil Boc received the vote of confidence from the Parliament and was sworn in at Cotroceni Palace. During the interim period, Traian Băsescu nominated repeatedly friendly candidates, despite the fact that the then opposition parties (PNL, PSD, UDMR, and the 18 representatives of the national ethnic minorities), having an absolute majority in both Houses of Parliament, expressed their will to nominate the Mayor of Sibiu Klaus Iohannis as Prime Minister.

Second Emil Boc cabinet

Mihai Răzvan Ungureanu cabinet

First Victor Ponta cabinet

Second Victor Ponta cabinet

Third Victor Ponta cabinet

Fourth Victor Ponta cabinet

Dacian Cioloș cabinet

Sorin Grindeanu cabinet

Mihai Tudose cabinet

Viorica Dăncilă cabinet

Ludovic Orban cabinet

Florin Cîțu cabinet

Nicolae Ciucă cabinet 

 
Government of Romania